The following is a list of symptoms and conditions that signal or constitute a possible wilderness medical emergency.

Injury and illnesses
 Arthropod bites and stings
 Appendicitis (leading to peritonitis)
 Ballistic trauma (gunshot wound when hunting)
 Eye injuries (such as from branches)
 Flail chest associated with ice climbing and snowclimbing falls
 Hyperthermia (heat stroke or sunstroke)
 Malignant hyperthermia
 Hypothermia 
 Frostbite
 Poisoning
 Food poisoning associated with warm weather expeditions
 Venomous animal bite
 Botanical from mushrooms or "wild greens""
 Severe burn (forest fire)
 Spreading wound infection
 Suspected spinal injury from falls, falling rock, ice
 Traumatic brain injury from falls, falling rock, ice

Diseases
 Lyme disease
 Malaria
 Necrotizing fasciitis
 Rabies
 Salmonella

Neurologic
 Subdural hematoma, associated with rockfall, icefall, falls while climbing, glissade crashes with rocks, mountain bike crashes

Respiratory
 Altitude sickness
 Asphyxia
 Drowning
 Smoke inhalation (related to Forest fire)
 Pneumothorax
 Pulmonary edema associated with high altitude (HAPE)
 Respiratory Arrest associated with neurotoxic bites

Shock
 Anaphylaxis associated with stings
 Hypovolemic shock (due to hemorrhage) associated with climbing falls, kayak crashes, etc.
 Septic shock

References

Emergency medicine
Medical emergencies